The Lodge Gallery was a contemporary art gallery located in New York City's Lower East Side and was active in the primary market. The gallery was owned and directed by founders Keith Schweitzer and Jason Patrick Voegele.

Voegele and Schweitzer were named as "Young New York Art Dealers to Watch" by Artnet News.

Voegele is a recurring critic for the NYFA Doctors Program. He is a graduate of the Pratt Institute master's program in painting and art history.

Schweitzer is also an owner/director of DAVID&SCHWEITZER Contemporary, a gallery located in Bushwick, Brooklyn. He has been a guest speaker at the Brooklyn Museum.

References

Art museums and galleries in Manhattan
Contemporary art galleries in the United States
Lower East Side